Aston Subedge (also written Aston-sub-Edge) is a village and civil parish in the Cotswold district of Gloucestershire, England, close by the border with Worcestershire (to the west).  According to the 2001 census the population was 55, increasing to 107 at the 2011 census.  The village  is about 8 miles east of Evesham, and near the village of Weston-sub-Edge.

The church of St Andrew was built in 1797 by Thomas Johnson of Warwick.

Christopher Savage, Lord of Elmley Castle, Worcestershire, and an Esquire of the Body of King Henry VIII, had livery of the
manor of Aston-sub-Edge on 14 May 1521, which he had inherited from his father, Sir Christopher Savage, Knt., (who fell at the Battle of Flodden in 1513) who had acquired it by his marriage to Anne, daughter of Sir John Stanley, Knt., of Elford, Staffordshire (d. Nov 1508) 

In the 1630s Endymion Porter, a courtier and diplomat who lived at Aston-sub-Edge, brought members of the court to see the Cotswold Olympics which were held on Dover's Hill.

References

 David Verey, Gloucestershire: the Cotswolds, The Buildings of England edited by Nikolaus Pevsner, 2nd ed. (1979) , p. 92

External links

 
 St Andrew Church, Aston-Sub-Edge

Villages in Gloucestershire
Civil parishes in Gloucestershire
Cotswold District